Olga Doménech Morales (21 September 1988 Sabadell, Barcelona) is a Spanish water polo player, who plays for CN Sabadell.

She participated in the 2006 Women's European Water Polo Championship, 2009 Women's Water Polo World Championship, 2013 Women's LEN Super Cup, 2014 Women's LEN Super Cup, 2015–16 LEN Euro League Women, and 2016 Women's LEN Super Cup.

References 

1988 births
Spanish female water polo players
Living people
21st-century Spanish women